You Got Served is a 2004 American dance drama film written and directed by Chris Stokes, who was also the business manager of the performers who were the film's main characters: recording artist Marques Houston and the boy band B2K. The plot follows a group of dancers who take part in a street dancing competition. You Got Served was produced by Marcus Morton, Cassius Vernon Weathersby, Billy Pollina, and Kris Cruz Toledo, and filming took place Between May 1, 2003, and June 25, 2003. The Columbia Pictures division Screen Gems released the film on January 30, 2004—the weekend of Super Bowl XXXVIII. It opened at #1 at the box office during its opening weekend, and grossed $16 million in its first week.

Despite negative reviews from critics, the film was a financial success, grossing over $50 million against its paltry $8 million budget. It was followed by one sequel, You Got Served: Beat the World (2011).

Plot

In Los Angeles, California, Elgin and David lead their promising dance crew in street dancing battles at a warehouse owned by Mr. Rad, where they defeat another crew led by Vick (Raz-B). David and Elgin's crew win the battle and Vick's crew is disappointed. David and Elgin's crew consists of notably: Rico (J-Boog), Rashaan (Lil' Fizz), and Sonny (Young Rome). Rico takes care of a little kid he knows named  Teshawn, whom the crew calls "Lil Saint".

To earn money for the battles, David and Elgin deliver for a drug lord named Emerald. They are challenged by Wade, a rich kid from Orange County, for $5,000. After winning another battle, David and Elgin tell their crew about the challenge they received from Wade. They mention that the 2 of them will put up the whole $5,000, and if their team wins, Elgin and David will split $3,000 and the other members of the crew will split the remaining $2,000. Their crew member Sonny is not fond of this idea and believes that because it is a team performance, the entire team should split the $5,000 evenly. All of the other members disagree with Sonny and understand that because Elgin and David are the ones putting up the money in the first place, it makes sense that they get a bigger cut of the profits.

Later on while Elgin, David and their crew are playing basketball, Wade and his best friend Max show up to the court and tell Elgin that they're surprised that he accepted their challenge. Elgin declares that the battle will be held a week later, but Wade and Max laugh at him and bait him in, claiming it's pathetic that Elgin and his crew needs an entire week to practice and that the battle should be held that night. Feeling prideful and not wanting to back down, Elgin accepts the challenge to compete that night, even though they only have $3,500 at the moment (the money they saved up from running drugs for Emerald). Thus, Elgin decides to borrow the remaining $1,500 from his grandmother for the battle.

Due to the amount of money on the line, Mr. Rad announces there will be no fighting during the battle and hires an off duty LAPD officer named Mr. Chuck to stop any potential ruckus. Upon arriving at the venue, David and Elgin realize that Sonny is not there, and he is also not picking up his cell phone. A few minutes later, Sonny arrives but he betrays the team and walks over to Wade and Max's side of the dance floor, revealing that he's now on their team. A fight breaks out after David and Elgin realize their opponent has stolen their dance set and that Sonny taught their opponents the routine, effectively “selling them out.” Crowing over his success, Wade delivers the titular line, "You're just mad... 'cause tonight you suckers got served!"

David has been getting romantically closer to Liyah, Elgin's sister. While discussing their loss to Wade on the basketball court, Elgin and David decide that they have to pick up some extra shifts for Emerald to recoup their losses. Vick arrives and asks to join their crew and says that his crew disbanded after repeatedly losing battles. David leaves the court and tells Elgin that instead of picking him up so that they can go to Emerald's spot that night, David will meet him up there separately, as he has something to do at the moment. That "something to do" turns out to be going on a date with Liyah. While on a date, David gets excessive calls from his friends, to the annoyance of Liyah. Elgin gets a call from Emerald for a delivery of drugs and says that he and David need to come in earlier. When Elgin tries to call David, Liyah turns off David's phone before David can see who's calling, leaving Elgin to do the job himself. Elgin is ambushed by local thugs who take Emerald's money, leaving Elgin hospitalized, in trouble with Emerald, and furious at David for not showing up on time.

The friends split up and form their own crews. Elgin forbids Liyah to see David, ignoring her and David's desire to help him. Rico tells David and Elgin about the "Big Bounce", a $50,000 dance competition purportedly sponsored by MTV, which will provide the winning crew the opportunity to perform in a Lil' Kim video. Elgin sees this as a way to pay back Emerald and his grandmother. Attempts to bring Elgin and David together, particularly by Liyah and Rico, are unsuccessful.

Later on, Emerald and his guards approach Elgin at his grandmother's home and throw Elgin inside the car. Emerald fires Elgin from ever working for him again and gives Elgin a few weeks to return his money to him, warning Elgin that if he doesn't pay him back, he “won't walk, let alone dance again”. Emerald reveals that he usually gives people only 24 hours to return any stolen money from him, but he decided to give Elgin a few weeks because David called Emerald and begged him not to hurt Elgin.

At the Big Bounce Competition, many crews impress the judges in the qualifying rounds, including Wade's crew. Liyah talks with Mr. Rad about David and Elgin's problems, and Mr. Rad reveals that he has already taken care of the situation with Emerald (it is not revealed what he did exactly to fix it, he only mentions that he and his LAPD friend Mr. Chuck "took care of that already"). David's crew is eliminated after two slip-ups, while Elgin's crew makes it to the finals.

David and Liyah are then in a diner talking about David being eliminated from the competition. Rashann runs in to tell them that Lil Saint has been shot and they need to find Rico to tell him the news and head to the hospital. At the hospital, the crew finds out that Lil Saint has died after being shot in a drive-by. The next day, Rico tells Elgin that they should reunite the crew in honor of Lil' Saint. David arrives a few minutes later, asked by Liyah to try to end the feud, but explains that by the rules of the competition, they must compete with their initial crews and are not allowed to add members. David and Elgin still refuse to forgive each other.

Elgin's crew, renamed "The Lil' Saints", compete at the Big Bounce finals, hosted by Wade Robson and Lil' Kim. After multiple crews perform their routine, the winner is revealed to be a tie between "The Lil' Saints" and "Wade's Crew". Both crews refuse a tie, and Lil' Kim (advised by Mr. Rad), declares a head-to-head battle competition, with no rules. The no-rules effect allows other people to join the battling crews. David asks to join Elgin's crew, and although Elgin initially refuses, Rico responds by saying "Look, it's either David and all of us, or it's none of us". Elgin then forgives and allows David on his team.

They battle Wade's crew, dedicating the battle to Lil' Saint, and win after receiving the crowd's loudest approval. Elgin gives his blessing for David and Liyah to be together. Wade and Max confront the winners saying that David and Elgin got lucky by winning. David replies, "Y'all just mad, 'cause today, YOU suckas got served." As the crowd chants 'served', Wade and Max leave in shame, David and Elgin celebrate their victory with their friends and family while holding their $50,000 check.

Cast
 Marques Houston – Elgin Barrett Eugene Smith III, leader of the Lil Saints
 Omari "Omarion" Grandberry – David, co-leader of the Lil Saints and Elgin's best friend who falls for Liyah
 Simon Au - Dancer
 Orlando Perry - Dancer
 Jarell "J-Boog" Houston – Rico
 De'Mario "Raz-B" Thornton – Vick, leader of a rival crew then later on joins Elgin & David's crew
 Dreux "Lil' Fizz" Frederic – Rashann
 Jennifer Freeman – Liyah Smith, Elgin's sister who has a crush on David and starts dating him
 Meagan Good – 
 Steve Harvey – Mr. Rad, Elgin and David longtime friend who owns & runs the warehouse club that they perform in
 Christopher Jones – Wade, a spoiled rich kid
 Jerome "Young Rome" Jones –  Sonny, betrays David and Elgin's crew after a dispute about splitting the money they make
 Robert Hoffman – Max, Wade's best friend and lackey
 Malcolm David Kelley – TeShawn 'Lil' Saint' Miller, a young boy who joins David's crew but is later killed
 Jackée Harry – Mama Smith
 Babbal Kumar – dark dancer
 Wade Robson – Himself
 Lil' Kim – Herself
 La La Anthony – Herself
 Esther Scott - Elgin's Grandmother
 Michael Taliferro – Emerald, a crime boss whom Elgin and David work for
 Simon Rugala – choreographer
 Kevin Federline – Dancer
 Clifford McGhee – Dancer
 Dyneisha Rollins – Dancer 
 Columbus Short – Dancer
 Harry Shum Jr. – Dancer
 Mike Bodden – Dancer
 Aaron Davis – Dancer

Soundtrack
You Got Served Soundtrack features mainly music by B2K, but also Marques Houston, and many others.  There were some profanities in the soundtrack such as "Streets Is Callin'" but did not receive a PA label. The soundtrack was released on December 23, 2003.  Also, there was a release of a music video for B2K's single "Badaboom" featuring Fabolous and Marques Houston was the guest appearance.

Release
The film was released on DVD by Sony Pictures on May 18, 2004. The film debuted for the first time on the Blu-ray format on October 4, 2016, in a triple feature release by Mill Creek Entertainment. The other two films in the bundle include Gridiron Gang (2006) and Stomp the Yard (2007).

Reception
You Got Served opened at the #1 spot in the United States and grossed $40.3 million; the total worldwide gross was $48.6 million. 
On Rotten Tomatoes, it has an approval rating of 14% based on 71 reviews, with an average score of 4/10. Its critical consensus reads, "The dance sequences are exhilarating, but everything else about this movie is sloppy and generic." On Metacritic, the film has a weighted average score of 37 out of 100, indicating “generally unfavorable reviews”. Audiences polled by CinemaScore assigned the film an average grade of "A-" on its A+ to F scale.

Sequels
The official dance tutorials from the film were released shortly after the movie's release in 2004 on a tutorial DVD entitled You Got Served, Take It To The Streets.

You Got Served: Beat the World is a straight to DVD film released on June 21, 2011, starring Lil' C.
   
Beat the World is a film written and directed by Robert Adetuyi (writer of Stomp the Yard) released in 2011, by InnerCity Films. It was distributed in the United States on DVD by Sony Home Entertainment under the name You Got Served: Beat the World. The film stars Tyrone Brown, Mishael Morgan, Nikki Grant and Parkour artist Chase Armitage.
   
The original soundtrack was produced by Frank Fitzpatrick and released on Hip Hop Connect. It features KRS-One, K’naan, Ziggy Marley, Nneka, Les Nubians, MV Bill, Talib Kweli, Sway and Lina.
 
In 2019, a direct sequel to the film titled You Got Served 2, was announced.

References

External links
 
 
 
 

2004 films
2000s teen drama films
2000s musical drama films
American dance films
American musical drama films
American teen drama films
Hip hop dance
2000s hip hop films
Screen Gems films
Films scored by Tyler Bates
Films about dance competitions
2004 drama films
2000s English-language films
2000s American films